was a Japanese Samurai and Daimyo of the Sengoku period through late Azuchi–Momoyama period, who served Tokugawa Ieyasu. Torii died at the siege of Fushimi where his garrison was greatly outnumbered and destroyed by the army of Ishida Mitsunari. Torii's refusal to surrender had a great impact on Japanese history; the fall of Fushimi bought Ieyasu some time to regroup his army and eventually win the Battle at Sekigahara.

Early life
Torii was born in Okazaki, the son of Torii Tadayoshi. As a boy, he was sent as hostage to the Imagawa clan. The young Mototada served the then-Matsudaira Takechiyo as a page. After Ieyasu's return from the Imagawa clan, and his unification of Mikawa Province, Mototada served as one of his chief generals.

In 1572, Mototada succeeded the Torii family headship, following the death of his father.

Service under Ieyasu
In 1573, He fought at the Battle of Mikatagahara  and Battle of Suwahara Castle the following year and was wounded in the legs, which rendered walking difficult for him from then on.

Mototada served in all of Ieyasu's major campaigns. With only 2,000 men he mounted a rearguard action against the Hōjō clan's force of over 10,000, and defeated them; soon after, Ieyasu granted him Tanimura Castle in Kai Province.

Later, in 1585, he joined Ōkubo Tadayo and Hiraiwa Chikayoshi in laying siege to the Sanada clan's Ueda Castle.

After Ieyasu's move to the Kantō region, Torii was granted the 40,000 koku fief of Yasaku in Shimōsa Province, which made him a Daimyō.

Death

In August 1600, Mototada was forewarned by spies that an army of 40,000 battle-hardened followers of Toyotomi Hideyori were annihilating everything in their path on their march to Fushimi Castle. The 1800 men garrison at Fushimi Castle was badly outnumbered, yet escape for the men inside was still possible.  In an act of loyalty to his lord Tokugawa Ieyasu, Torii chose to remain behind, pledging that he and his bastion would fight to the finish.

In a last statement addressed to his son Torii Tadamasa, Mototada described how his family served the Tokugawa for generations and how his own brother had been killed in battle. In the letter, Torii stated that he considered it an honor to die first so that he might give courage to the rest of the Tokugawa warriors.  He requested that his son raise his siblings to serve the Tokugawa clan "In both ascent and decline" and to remain humble desiring neither lordship nor monetary reward.  Lifelong friends, Torii Mototada and Tokugawa Ieyasu parted ways sadly knowing that they would never see each other again:

 "It is not the Way of the Warrior to be shamed and avoid death even under circumstances that are not particularly important ... For myself, I am resolved to make a stand within the castle and to die a quick death. It would not take much trouble to break through a part of their numbers and escape, no matter how many tens of thousands of horsemen approached for the attack or by how many columns we were surrounded. But that is not the true meaning of being a warrior, and it would be difficult to account as loyalty. Rather, I will stand off the forces of the entire country here, and ... die a resplendent death."

In the end, with the castle in flames around him, Torii ordered his men to charge headlong into battle over and over again until only ten remained. The castle defenders fought heroically to the last man. As was custom, Torii killed himself rather than be captured alive.

Notable Action
Torii Mototada's actions had a great impact on the course of Japanese history. Tokugawa Ieyasu would raise an army of 90,000 and confront Ishida Mitsunari's forces at Sekigahara in what would be one of the bloodiest battles in the Sengoku period. 40,000 heads would be taken in the first hours of battle and 70,000 would perish in the next two days as the remnants of Mitsunari's vanquished army were hunted down and executed. The Battle of Sekigahara was a decisive one, resulting in the unification of Japan. Tokugawa's family would rule the entire country for the next 268 years.

Mototada's suicide at the fall of Fushimi is one of the most celebrated acts of seppuku in Japanese history.

Descendance

Among his descendants, Ōishi Yoshio (1659-1703), Karō (Chief retainer) of the Akō Asano clan, leader and hero of the Forty-seven Rōnin's revenge against Kira Yoshinaka, was his great-great-grandson, through Yoshio's father Ōishi Yoshiaki, maternal grandson of Torii Tadakatsu, fourth son of Torii Mototada.

Notes

References
Totman, Conrad. Tokugawa Ieyasu: Shogun.
https://web.archive.org/web/20091002235330/http://www.city.okazaki.aichi.jp/museum/DB/KIKAKU/E/e001%20toriimototada.htm
https://web.archive.org/web/20080307054400/http://www.h7.dion.ne.jp/~history/sub2.html
http://www7a.biglobe.ne.jp/~echigoya/jin/ToriiMototada.html
The Last Statement of Torii Mototada  Written on the eve of his castle's destruction (1600 AD)

1539 births
1600 deaths
Torii clan
Daimyo
Suicides by seppuku
Japanese pages
People from Okazaki, Aichi